Swedish wine, in terms of wine produced commercially from grapes grown in Sweden, is a very marginal but growing industry which saw its first beginnings in the late 1990s.

In less strict usage, the term "Swedish wine" has also been applied to fruit wine from Sweden, which has a very long tradition, and wine produced in Sweden from imported grape juice, which goes back longer than actual viticulture in Sweden.

History
Sweden is well north of the area where the European vine, Vitis vinifera, occurs naturally, and there is no tradition of wine production from grapes in the country. Some sources claim that some monastic vineyards were established when the Roman Catholic church established monasteries in Sweden in medieval times, when Sweden's climate was milder, but traces of this supposed viticulture are much less evident than the corresponding activities in England, for example.

Small-scale growing of grapes in Swedish orangeries and other greenhouses has occurred for a long time, but the purpose of such plantations was to provide table grapes as fruit or for decoration or exhibition purposes, and not to provide grapes for wine production.

Towards the end of the 20th century, commercial viticulture slowly crept north, into areas beyond the well-established wine regions, as evidenced by Canadian wine, English wine and Danish wine. This trend was partially made possible by the use of new hybrid grape varieties, partially by new viticultural techniques, and partially by climate change.

The idea of commercial freeland viticulture in Sweden appeared in the 1990s. Some pioneers, especially in Skåne (Scania), took their inspiration from nearby Denmark, where viticulture started earlier than in Sweden, while others took their inspiration from experiences in other winemaking countries.

Perhaps surprisingly, the first two wineries of some size were not established in the far south of Sweden, but in Södermanland County close to Flen (in an area where orchards were common), and on the island of Gotland, which has the largest number of sunshine hours in Sweden. Later expansions have mostly been in Scania.

There are also small-scale viticulturalists who grow their grapes in greenhouses rather than in the open.

Small quantities of a few commercial Swedish wines were sold by Systembolaget from the early 2000s.

Modern industry
Only a handful of Swedish producers can be considered to be commercial operations, rather than hobby wine makers. In 2006, the Swedish Board of Agriculture counted four Swedish companies that commercialized wine produced from their own vineyards.

The Association of Swedish winegrowers estimates 30-40 vinegrowing establishments in Scania, but this number includes hobby growers with a fraction of a hectare of vineyards.

Regulations
As a member of the European Union, wine production in Sweden has to abide by the European Union wine regulations. However, as  the total commercial vineyard area in Sweden stayed below , Sweden did not have to apply planting rights. Since this part of the regulations was abolished in 2015, Sweden was never affected by them.

So far, Sweden has only enacted a minimum of national legislation and regulations related to viticulture, which includes a list of allowed grape varieties. However, there are no protected designations of origin for Swedish wine, which means that Swedish producers are restricted to marketing table wines, and can not market quality wines. This means several restrictions on labeling practices. For example, the vintage year may not be mentioned on the label.

Grape varieties
The following grape varieties are authorized for commercial wine production in Sweden:

White grapes

 Bacchus
 Bianca
 Chardonnay
 Kerner
 Madeleine Angevine 7672
 Malingre Précoce
 Merzling

 Müller-Thurgau
 Orion
 Ortega
 Phoenix
 Reichensteiner
 Riesling
 Sauvignon blanc

 Seyval blanc
 Siegerrebe
 Solaris
 Vidal blanc
 Zalas Perle

Red grapes

 Acolon
 Cabernet Dorsa
 Cabernet Franc
 Frühburgunder

 Garanoir
 Léon Millot
 Merlot

 Pinot noir
 Regent
 Rondo

References

 
Agriculture in Sweden